Fusochloris is a genus of green algae in the order Microthamniales.

References

External links

Trebouxiophyceae genera
Trebouxiophyceae
Microthamniales